The Crosshall Cross is a cross at Crosshall Farm, Eccles, in the Scottish Borders area of Scotland, in historic Berwickshire.

The cross is situated near Crosshall farmhouse and is said to date from the 12th century, after the Second Crusade. It is ca. 3 metres high and is thought to be a memorial stone of someone who had been to the Holy Land. The coat of arms may be that of the Soulis family.

Other places nearby include Fogo, Gavinton, the Greenknowe Tower, Greenlaw, Hume Castle, Leitholm, Longformacus, Polwarth, Westruther.

See also
List of places in the Scottish Borders
List of places in Scotland

References
 Hardy, J (1885e), 'On the ancient cross at Crosshall, in the Parish of Eccles, Berwickshire', Hist Berwickshire Natur Club, vol.10, page 368
 Robertson, R (1792), 'A description of an ancient obelisk in Berwickshire: with an engraving', Archaeol Scot, vol.1, 269 illustr

External links
CANMORE/RCAHMS record of Crosshall, Eccles Cross; Carved Stone; Crosshall Farm; Deadriggs
Discovering the Borders: Crosshall Cross, Eccles
Scottish Borders Heritage: Crosshall cross
Crosshall Farm, site of cross

Archaeological sites in the Scottish Borders
High crosses in Scotland
Monumental crosses in Scotland
Monuments and memorials in Scotland
Scheduled monuments in Scotland